Anupam Hazra (born 30 May 1982) is a social work educator, development professional and a politician from West Bengal, India. A masters in social Work from Visva-Bharati University, Anupam Hazra has been associated with the non profit sector since 2005. He had completed his doctoral research on Rural Sanitation from Assam University. Currently he is serving as a national secretary of the Bharatiya Janata Party and was a former Member of Parliament from All India Trinamool Congress.

Life and works 
Presently he is an assistant professor in the Social Work Department of Visva Bharati University, Santiniketan, West Bengal. He has worked with various development organizations across the country. Anupam Hazra is a regular contributor to various international and national journals. Some of his articles are "The Ignored Indians" (Man and Development 2009) "Tackling The Global Threat of Climate Change" (Journal of Social Welfare 2009), "Corruption and Development: Exploring The Dynamics in Social Action" (2009), "An Analysis of Scarcity in a State of Surplus", Journal of Social Economics (USA) in 2010 and many more.

He is a regular author with Kurukshetra, a Journal of Rural Development published by Ministry of Rural Development and has published hundreds of articles. He has participated and presented papers at national and international conferences. He is a visiting faculty at several Indian academic institutions. Anupam Hazra is the editor of Social Work Chronicle, published by Publishing India Group.

Political career 
Hazra started his political career as a Member of Parliament in the Lok Sabha from Trinamool Congress representing Bolpur constituency.

Hazra was expelled by TMC on January 9 for antiparty activities. He was fielded by the BJP in March to contest from the Jadavpur Lok Sabha seat. Trinamool Congress's Mimi Chakraborty registered a landslide victory over Anupam Hazra with a margin of 295239 votes. Hazra was appointed as the BJP's national general secretary on 26 September 2020.

Publications 
 Hazra, A (2009) 'Tackling The Global Threat of Climate Change', Journal of Social Welfare; Vol. 56, No. 3 
 Hazra, A (2009) 'Displacements: An Emerging Global Concern', Kurukshetra, A Journal of Rural Development Vol. 57, No. 8 
 Hazra, A (2009) 'Food for All - Still a Distant Dream' Kurukshetra, A Journal of Rural Development Vol. 57, No. 11 
 Hazra, A (2009) 'Educational Status of Women in India', Journal of Social Welfare Vol. 56, No. 6 
 Hazra, A (2009) 'Gender Disparity in Education' Yojana, Ministry of Information and Broadcasting Vol. 53 
 Hazra, A (2009) 'The Ignored Indians' Man and Development Vol. 32, No, 3 
 Hazra, A (2009) 'Corruption and Development: Exploring The Dynamics' Social Action Vol. 59, No. 4 
 Hazra, A (2010) 'State of Health in India The Current Scenario' Kurukshetra, A Journal of Rural Development Vol. 58, No. 4. 
 Hazra, A (2010) 'Development at the cost of Human life?' Social Action Vol. 60, No. 2 
 JOURNAL ON Social ECONOMICS Consortium for Teaching, Research, Learning and Development, USA Spring 2010 An Analysis of Scarcity in a State of Surplus Page 37   
 JOURNAL ON SOCIOLOGY Consortium for Teaching, Research, Learning and Development, USA Spring 2010, Gender Budgeting: The Emerging Framework For Raising Women Voices Page 99 
 Hazra, A (2010) 'Migration: Still A Survival Strategy for Rural India' Kurukshetra, A Journal of Rural Development Vol. 59, No. 2 
 Hazra, A (2013) 'Rural India and the Emerging Developmental Challenges', Mittal Publications, New Delhi 
 Hazra, A (2014) 'Sustaining Development in North-East India: Emerging Issues, Challenges and Policy Measures', Concept Publishing Pvt.

References

External links 
 https://www.facebook.com/anupamhazra.tmc
 http://www.facultystudentconference.org/
 https://web.archive.org/web/20110313063941/http://www.monad.edu.in/humanitiesadjunctfaculty.html

Living people
20th-century Indian educational theorists
1982 births
India MPs 2014–2019
Visva-Bharati University alumni
Assam University alumni
Academic staff of Visva-Bharati University
Lok Sabha members from West Bengal
People from Birbhum district
Bharatiya Janata Party politicians from West Bengal
Former members of Trinamool Congress